A storey is a level in a building.

Storey may also refer to:

 Storey (surname)
 Storey (automobile), a British car produced 1916–1930
 Storey, California, unincorporated community in Madera County, USA
 Storey Publishing, an imprint of the Workman Publishing Company
 Storey's Way, a street in Cambridge, England
 The Storey, a multi-purpose building in Lancaster, England

See also
 Story (disambiguation)